Bamaga is a small town and locality about  from the northern tip of Cape York in the north of Queensland, Australia. It is within the Northern Peninsula Area Region. It is one of the northernmost settlements in continental Australia and is the administrative centre for the Northern Peninsula Area Regional Council.

History
The present site was established after World War II by people from Saibai Island in Torres Strait, after Saibai Island was devastated by abnormally high tides. It is named after Saibai elder Bamaga Ginau, who envisaged the site but died before it was established.

In 1947, the Bamaga township was moved to its present site as a result of a need by the founding people for a larger supply of fresh water. With local industries and the Northern Peninsula Airport (on Urradhi traditional land) Bamaga became the administrative centre for the Northern Peninsula Area, which was made up of the three Aboriginal communities of Injinoo, Umagico and New Mapoon, and the Islander communities of Seisia and Bamaga. All five are Deed of Grant in Trust — communities with their own community councils.

Bamaga Post Office opened by September 1951.

Bamaga State School opened on 28 January 1964. On 23 March 2005, it was renamed Northern Peninsula Area State College.

Some 20 years later, another community, "New Mapoon", was established. It was set up for the forced relocation of people of "Old Mapoon" community, located some two hours north by road from the township of Weipa for bauxite mining.

Bamaga State High School opened on 30 January 1973, but closed on 9 December 1994.

Geography
All communities, except Bamaga and New Mapoon, are located on the coastline, and the current residents hold a close affiliation with the sea. The current populations are approximately 75% Islander and 20% Aboriginal.

Bamaga and the surrounding communities are located north of the Jardine River which supplies the town water.

Bamaga has an Islander population of approximately 700 people with a further 300 temporary non-islander residents. The Community has reticulated town water, which is pumped from the Jardine River. A new water treatment plant has been constructed recently and Bamaga is fully sewered.

Climate
 
Bamaga experiences a tropical savanna climate (Köppen: Aw, Trewartha: Awaa), with hot conditions year-round. There is a wet season from mid-November to mid-May, and a dry season from mid-May to mid-November.

Language
The community languages of Bamaga are Kalaw Kawaw Ya, Brokan (Torres Strait Creole), and English, particularly for education and government business.

Industry
All of Bamaga's internal and main roads are sealed. The major industry is tourism mainly during the drier months of the year. This runs from May – October (The Developmental Road is impassable during the wet season and the ferry across the Jardine River does not operate).

The community owns Resort Bamaga, an accommodation house for corporate visitors.

There is some cattle production, small business retailing and a concrete batching plant. Bamaga Island Council is the biggest employer with 200 staff. Modern supermarkets can be found at Seisia and Umagico.

There is a community pharmacy, general merchandise/clothing store, a video store, Post Office, Service Station/workshop, snack bar, pub and bakery in Bamaga as well as an Anglican church store and thrift shop.

Education
Northern Peninsula Area State College is a government primary and secondary (Early Childhood-12) school for boys and girls. In 2018, the school had an enrolment of 634 students with 69 teachers (68 full-time equivalent) and 34 non-teaching staff (24 full-time equivalent). It includes a special education program. The college has its Bamaga senior campus at Sagaukaz Street. Its Bagama junior campus is at Anu Street. The college has a second junior campus in the town of Injinoo.

The Bamaga and New Mapoon Communities have established Child Care Centres for early childhood schooling.

The Cape York Campus, a technical and further education (TAFE) college, has been established at Bamaga. The campus provides a wide range of tutorial courses including seamanship and other courses.

Northern Peninsula Area Regional Council operates an Indigenous Knowledge Centre at HACC Centre Building in Adidi Street, Bamaga.

Utilities

Electricity supply
Bamaga and neighboring communities have a 240 volt power supply generated from the Ergon Energy stand-alone diesel power station at Bamaga. There are two local linesman stationed at Bamaga. Most lines are antiquated and subject to breakdowns causing blackouts on occasions.

Residents purchase electricity through pre-paid Powercards, which are similar to phonecards and are available in $20 or $50 amounts. Powercards are inserted into the switchboards at the residence.

Water supply

The quality of the town drinking water has improved of late with the introduction of new community reservoirs and the newly completed water treatment plant by Sunwater.  The town water is sourced from the Jardine River supply.

Sewerage

Sewerage for all communities except Seisia is by underground sewer. Seisia is proposing to remove all septics in favour of sewer in the coming budgets.

Amenities
Fishing and camping are very popular.  A boat and 4WD vehicle would be handy. There is the Bamaga Tavern open Monday-Saturday and Seisia Fishing Club which serves food and drinks on Fridays with live music.  There are restaurants at the Seisia Village Resort, Seisia; Resort Bamaga;  Loyalty Beach Fishing Lodge, and also Punsand Bay Lodge, Punsand Bay. There are also take-away shops at Seisia, New Mapoon (Loyalty Beach camp ground and local store) and Bamaga communities.

The sporting facilities at Bamaga have undergone a recent facelift and there are now established Olympic Basketball courts, Volleyball courts & Tennis courts. Football has again emerged as a strong sport in the region and councils have constructed night lighting of the fields for cooler night games. There are five organised football teams in the communities.

To assist sporting ventures in the region, a newly constructed Gymnasium at the Basketball courts will assist with health and training.

There are also established darts, pool and fishing.

St Stephen's Catholic Church is in Lui Street. It is within the Thursday Island Parish of the Roman Catholic Diocese of Cairns.

Tourism

The adventure of a 4WD trip to Bamaga through very rugged terrain is the main catalyst for tourist activity by road. There are many sights, towns and other points of interest during the journey.  Tourist activities whilst at Bamaga include Sight-seeing tours to Thursday Island, Guided fishing and pig hunting tours; bird watching in the nearby Lockerbie Scrub rainforest; visiting World War II aircraft wrecks in the Bamaga area and also at Horn Island (near Thursday Island) and photo shoots at the "Tip of Australia".  The area is shrouded in history with culture and war memorabilia.

It is a camping area and day trip for barbecue.

Medical

The Bamaga Hospital as an establishment has five medical doctors and 14 nurses who can capably handle most cases presented. Emergency cases are assessed and patients are either helivaced to Thursday Island Hospital by Australian Helicopters under contract to the Department of Emergency Services or by Royal Flying Doctor Service to Cairns.

Bamaga pharmacy is located next to the main ibis store with a fully qualified pharmacist available at all times to provide medications, advice and essential pharmacy services.

The Bamaga and surrounding communities are also serviced by the Queensland Ambulance Service. The QAS at Bamaga has two permanent officers which are of paramedic standard and have one of the most modern ambulances in use in Queensland today.

Veterinary services are limited but accessible. At present, a visiting veterinary specialist attends the premises of the Torres Shire Council, Thursday Island on a regular basis. Notification is usually in the local newspaper the Torres News. To attend for appointment will necessitate a ferry ride with your pet to Thursday Island. Usually this trip can be completed in the one day unless overnight care for the pet is required.  This specialist can also be contacted at her surgery in times of emergency.

Government departments

The Department of Agriculture and Water Resources' Biosecurity Service (formerly the Australian Quarantine and Inspection Service) has a base in Bamaga.

Shopping and fuel

The Bamaga township has one major supermarket/variety store which is operated by the Islander Board of Industry and Service. The IBIS services most islands through the Torres Strait. The store at Bamaga is air-conditioned and has a comparable food line with major retailers in Cairns.  The store does have frozen meat from Cairns butchers. The Bamaga and surrounding communities are serviced by Sea Swift twice weekly. Freight charges are minimal and delivery is to the door.

Air-conditioned supermarkets are also at Seisia and Umagico Communities.

The Seisia Meatworks has recently commenced operation which provides a range of meat products. Meat is sourced locally as well as grain fed regions such as Atherton Tablelands and Gympie.

Fresh produce is delivered by shipping companies and available twice weekly (Monday and Thursday).

A local clothing store has limited lines of clothing and some lines of haberdashery.  There is no local hairdresser however there are some on Thursday Island.

There are three service stations located at Bamaga, Seisia and Injinoo.  Diesel and unleaded petrol are available.  Mechanical services are also available at various locations in the Community.

See also

Torres Strait Islanders

References

External links
 
 Northern Peninsula Area Regional Council

Towns in Queensland
Populated places in Far North Queensland
Torres Strait Islands communities
Populated places established in 1947
Aboriginal communities in Queensland
1947 establishments in Australia
Northern Peninsula Area Region
Localities in Queensland